Admiral Sir Sidney Julius Meyrick KCB (28 March 1879 – 18 December 1973) was a Royal Navy officer who went on to be Commander-in-Chief, America and West Indies Station.

Naval career
Meyrick joined the Royal Navy in 1893. He served in the First World War in HMS Erin and then in HMS Resolution in the Grand Fleet.

After the War he became Flag Captain commanding HMS Courageous and Chief Staff Officer to the Commander-in-Chief of the Reserve Fleet in 1920 and then moved on to be Commander of the 6th Destroyer Flotilla in 1921. He was made Flag Captain commanding HMS Revenge and Chief Staff Officer to the Commander-in-Chief of the Atlantic Fleet in 1922.

He joined the Staff of the Royal Naval College, Greenwich, in 1923 and became Director of Training and Staff Duties at the Admiralty in 1926. He was appointed Flag Captain commanding  and Captain of the Fleet to the Commander-in-Chief of the Atlantic Fleet in 1927 before becoming Captain of the Royal Naval College, Dartmouth in 1929 and Naval Secretary in 1932. He was then made Commander of the 2nd Cruiser Squadron in 1934 and Commander-in-Chief, America and West Indies Station in 1937.

At the start of the Second World War, formations under Meyrick's command as Commander-in-Chief, America and West Indies Station, included the 8th Cruiser Squadron and two escort ships. In 1940 he was credited with forcing the Captain of the German liner Columbus to scuttle his ship. He retired in 1940.

He died at the family home and estate, Norton House, near Chichester in Sussex.

Family
In 1901 he married Judith Fullerton, the daughter of Admiral Sir John Fullerton; they had three sons, named Timothy, Michael and Peter.

References

|-

1879 births
1973 deaths
Royal Navy officers of World War I
Academics of the Royal Naval College, Greenwich
Royal Navy vice admirals
Royal Navy admirals of World War II
Knights Commander of the Order of the Bath
Bermuda in World War II